Romeu Pellicciari, also known as Romeu (born in Jundiai, March 26, 1911 – died in São Paulo, July 15, 1971) was an association footballer in striker role.

By Italian origins, during his career (1928–1944) he played for União São João, Palmeiras, Fluminense and Comercial-Ribeirão Preto, and won four São Paulo State Championship (1932, 1933, 1934 and 1942), five Rio de Janeiro State Championship (1936, 1937, 1938, 1940 and 1941), one Rio São Paulo Tournament in 1933 and won top goalscorer São Paulo State Championship in 1934. For Brazilian team who have participated at 1938 FIFA World Cup placed at third place, played four matches and scored three goals. With Leônidas, Domingos and José Perácio, forming one of the most valuable four-striker team of the 1930s. He died at 60 years old.

References

1911 births
1971 deaths
Brazilian footballers
Brazil international footballers
Association football forwards
Sociedade Esportiva Palmeiras players
Fluminense FC players
Brazilian people of Italian descent
1938 FIFA World Cup players
People from Jundiaí
Footballers from São Paulo (state)